The men's 200 metres event at the 1987 Summer Universiade was held at the Stadion Maksimir in Zagreb on 16 and 17 July 1987.

Medalists

Results

Heats
Wind:Heat 6: +1.4 m/s, Heat 10: +2.3 m/s

Quarterfinals

Wind:Heat 2: +1.4 m/s, Heat 3: +1.4 m/s, Heat 4: +1.4 m/s

Semifinals

Final

Wind: +1.4 m/s

References

Athletics at the 1987 Summer Universiade
1987